Gerard Sławomir Pokruszyński (born 1959 in Warsaw) is a Polish diplomat, since 2017 serving as an ambassador to Iceland.

Life 
Gerard Pokruszyński holds an M.A. in sociology from the University of Warsaw. He has been studying also at the Lund University and University of Florence. Since 2001, he holds a Ph.D. in defence and strategy from the National Defence University of Warsaw.

He was working as a lecturer at the Warsaw University of Technology, Faculty of Socio-Economic Sciences. In 1991, Pokruszyński joined the Ministry of Foreign Affairs. He was holding post of Consul-General thrice: in Milan (1993–1999), Malmö (2004–2007), and Catania (2007–2009). He was working also as a counselor at the Permanent Representation of the Republic of Poland to the OECD, Paris (2001–2002), and at the embassy in Kyiv as minister-counselor for political affairs.

At the MFA he was director of the Department of Promotion (1999–2000) and director of the Department for Foreign Affairs in the Chancellery of the Prime Minister (2000), the Minister’s Secretariat (2015–2017), director of the Eastern Department (2017).

In December 2017, Pokruszyński was appointed Poland ambassador to Iceland.

Beside Polish, he speaks English and Italian, Swedish, and Russian. He is married to Margherita Bacigalupo.

References 

1959 births
Ambassadors of Poland to Iceland
Consuls-General of Poland
Living people
Diplomats from Warsaw
University of Warsaw alumni